The Lola T310 is a Group 7 sports prototype race car, designed, developed, and built by the British manufacturer and constructor Lola, to compete in the Can-Am championship from the 1972 season.

References

Sports prototypes
T310
Can-Am cars